Gholam Vafakhah (born 23 February 1947 in Tehran) is a retired Iranian forward who played for Iran national football team in 1972 Summer Olympics and 1970 RCD Cup. He was formerly playing for Taj Tehran and Iran national football team.

References

External links
 
 Ghulam Vafakhah at TeamMelli.com

Iran international footballers
Iranian footballers
Esteghlal F.C. players
Olympic footballers of Iran
Footballers at the 1972 Summer Olympics
Living people
1947 births
Association football forwards